Nakusp Airport  is an airport in British Columbia, Canada,  north by northwest of Nakusp. Its asphalt runway is 2983 feet (909 metres) long.

References

Registered aerodromes in British Columbia
Regional District of Central Kootenay